Live at Montreux 2010 is a live album and Blu-ray/DVD by the Northern Irish, blues rock guitarist and singer, Gary Moore. It was recorded at the Montreux Jazz Festival on 6 July 2010, and released on 19 September 2011. This would prove to be Gary Moore's last filmed performance before his death on 6 February 2011.

The live performance draws mainly from the Wild Frontier album and era, as well as featuring three new songs which were planned to feature on a new Celtic-rock album, although this project never materialised due to his death on 6 February 2011.

Track listing

Performances

Bonus Tracks

Personnel
 Gary Moore - Lead vocals, lead and rhythm guitar
 Neil Carter - Keyboards, backing vocals, rhythm guitar
 Jonathan Noyce - Bass guitar
 Darrin Mooney - Drums
Live at Montreux 1997 Bonus tracks
 Gary Moore - Lead vocals, lead and rhythm guitar
 Magnus Fiennes - Keyboards
 Guy Pratt - Bass guitar, backing vocals
 Gary Husband - Drums

References

2010 live albums
Gary Moore albums
Live hard rock albums
Live blues rock albums
albums recorded at the Montreux Jazz Festival